The Amateurliga Saarland was the highest football league in the state of Saarland and the third tier of the German football league system from 1951, when the clubs from the Saar returned to Germany, till the formation of the Oberliga Südwest and the Verbandsliga Saarland below it in 1978.

Overview 
The Ehrenliga Saarland was formed in 1947 in the state of Saarland. The league was originally a feeder league to the Oberliga Südwest. Due to the special situation of Saarland, its clubs left the German football league system from 1948 to 1951 with the 1. FC Saarbrücken playing a year in the French second division.
Three seasons in this period were played under independent Saarland Football Association control.
From its return in 1951, now under the name of Amateurliga Saarland, until the establishment of the Oberliga Südwest in 1978, it was the third tier of the football league system.

The league was established in 1947 with ten teams, the winner gaining promotion to the Oberliga Südwest. The founder members were:
 FC Homburg
 Sportfreunde Burbach
 FC Ensdorf
 SC Brebach
 Preußen Merchweiler
 FV Püttlingen
 SV Ludweiler
 ASC Dudweiler
 SV Bliekastel
 Hellas Marpingen
 Viktoria Hühnerfeld

With the return to the German league system in 1951, two teams from the Amateurliga were admitted to the Oberliga Südwest, the 1. FC Saarbrücken and Borussia Neunkirchen.

The year after, three clubs were admitted to the new 2. Oberliga Südwest, the Viktoria Hühnerfeld, SC Altenkessel und Sportfreunde Saarbrücken.

The winner of the Amateurliga Saarland was not automatically promoted to its superior league but rather had to take part in a promotion play-off. The champion would have to compete with the winners of the Amateurliga Südwest and Rheinland.

With the introduction of the Bundesliga in 1963 the Amateurliga was placed below the new Regionalliga Südwest but still retained its third-tier status. It continued to do so after the introduction of the 2. Bundesliga Süd in 1974.

Disbanding of the Amateurliga Saarland 
In 1978, the Oberliga Südwest was formed to allow direct promotion to the 2. Bundesliga Süd for the amateur champion of the area. The last league winner, Borussia Neunkirchen, was promoted to the 2. Bundesliga. The teams placed two to seven gained entry to the Oberliga while the other twelve teams were put into the new Verbandsliga Saarland, now the fourth tier of the football league system.

Admitted to the new Oberliga:
 SV Röchling Völklingen
 SV St. Wendel
 VfB Dillingen
 ASC Dudweiler
 SV Auersmacher
 FSV Saarwellingen

Relegated to the new Verbandsliga:
 SC Friedrichsthal
 SSV Überherrn
 SV Bliesen
 FV Eppelborn
 SV Hasborn
 VfB Theley
 FC Ensdorf
 Saar 05 Saarbrücken
 SV Oberthal
 SV Weiskirchen
 SV Fraulautern
 SV St. Ingbert

Winners of the Amateurliga Saarland

Source:
 Bold denotes team gained promotion.
 In 1951 the Borussia Neunkirchen was also promoted despite only finishing ninth in the league.
 In 1952 the league winner was promoted for a last time to the Oberliga Südwest and the teams placed second to fourth went to the new 2. Oberliga Südwest.
 In 1953 promotion went to the fourth placed ASC Dudweiler.

References

Sources
 Deutschlands Fußball in Zahlen,  An annual publication with tables and results from the Bundesliga to Verbandsliga/Landesliga, publisher: DSFS
 kicker Almanach,  The yearbook on German football from Bundesliga to Oberliga, since 1937, published by the kicker Sports Magazine
 Süddeutschlands Fussballgeschichte in Tabellenform 1897–1988  History of Southern German football in tables, publisher & author: Ludolf Hyll
 Die Deutsche Liga-Chronik 1945–2005  History of German football from 1945 to 2005 in tables, publisher: DSFS, published: 2006

External links 
 Das deutsche Fussball Archiv  Historic German league tables
 Saarland Football Association website 

1978 disestablishments in Germany
Defunct association football leagues in Germany
Football competitions in Saarland
1951 establishments in Germany
Sports leagues established in 1951
Ger